5EBI is a multi-ethnic community broadcaster located in Adelaide. Originally launched as non-English programmes on 5UV, Adelaide Ethnic Broadcasters Incorporated was given their own frequency in 1979, on 103.1 FM.

References

Radio stations in Adelaide
Community radio stations in Australia